Loïc Druon (born 23 August 1971) is a French football manager and former player who played as a defender.

Honours 
Châteauroux

 Division 2: 1996–97

Lorient

 Coupe de France: 2001–02
 Coupe de la Ligue runner-up: 2001–02

Notes

References 

1971 births
Living people
Sportspeople from Quimper
Footballers from Brittany
French footballers
Association football defenders
Brittany international footballers
Quimper Kerfeunteun F.C. players
Stade Briochin players
LB Châteauroux players
FC Lorient players
Clermont Foot players
US Concarneau players
French Division 3 (1971–1993) players
Ligue 2 players
Championnat National players
Ligue 1 players
Championnat National 3 players
Championnat National 2 players
French football managers
Association football player-managers